Glenville High school Stats
Tackles 236
Sacks 72
Pass break ups 3 
Forced fumbles 3

Curtis Young (born January 8, 1987) is an American football defensive end who is currently a free agent. He has been a member of the Sacramento Mountain Lions Green Bay Packers, Cleveland Gladiators and Pittsburgh Power.

Career
On March 24, 2015, Young was assigned to the Philadelphia Soul on a 1-year deal. On May 26, 2015, Young was placed on recallable reassignment by the Soul. On June 3, 2015, Young was assigned to the Cleveland Gladiators. The Gladiators placed Young on reassignment on July 8, 2015.On March 10, 2016, Young was assigned to the Gladiators. On July 26, 2016, Young was placed on reassignment.

References

External links
Just Sports Stats

1987 births
Living people
American football defensive ends
Cincinnati Bearcats football players
Cleveland Gladiators players
Green Bay Packers players
Philadelphia Soul players
Pittsburgh Power players
Players of American football from Cleveland
Sacramento Mountain Lions players
Washington Valor players